This is a list of textile factories that have existed in Shaw and Crompton, formerly of Lancashire and now in Greater Manchester, England.

From the Industrial Revolution until the 20th century, Crompton (as it was then mainly known) was a major centre of textile manufacture, particularly cotton spinning. During this period, it was dominated by large rectangular brick-built factories, some of which still remain today as warehouses or distribution centres. The town has seen forty-eight separate textile factories built within its boundaries.

A–E

F–J

K–O

P–U

V–Z

Additional images

See also

List of mills in Oldham
List of mills in Chadderton

References

Bibliography

External links

 Cottontown.org website
 Spinningtheweb.org website

Shaw and Crompton
.Mills
Shaw and Crompton
Shaw and Crompton
Buildings and structures in the Metropolitan Borough of Oldham
Shaw and Crompton
History of the textile industry
Industrial Revolution in England